Wilsoniella is a genus of mosses belonging to the family Ditrichaceae.

Species:
 Wilsoniella blindioides (Broth.) Sainsbury 
 Wilsoniella bornensis Broth.

References

Dicranales
Moss genera